The 2011 African Futsal Championship was the 4th edition of this tournament which took place on 3-17 April 2011 in Burkina Faso, but the tournament was ultimately cancelled.

Qualified nations 

Burkina Faso was an automatic qualifier as the host country. Libya also received an automatic berth for winning the previous edition.

Draw 
The draw was scheduled to take place on 9 October 2010 but was postponed till further notice.

The Confederation of African Football announced that the 2011 Futsal Championship has been cancelled. Burkina Faso withdrew from hosting the event which was meant to start at the beginning of April and a replacement could not be found therefore the championship wasn't held.

A separate qualifying tournament was organized for qualification to the 2012 FIFA Futsal World Cup.

References 

2011
Futsal Championship
2011 in futsal
2011 in Burkinabé sport
Futsal in Burkina Faso
Cancelled sports events